SS Black Osprey was a cargo ship for the American Diamond Lines and the British Cairn Line. She was formerly known as SS West Arrow when she was launched for the United States Shipping Board (USSB) during World War I. The ship was inspected by the United States Navy for possible use as USS West Arrow (ID-2585) but was neither taken into the Navy nor ever commissioned under that name.

West Arrow was built in 1918 for the USSB, as a part of the West boats, a series of steel-hulled cargo ships built on the West Coast of the United States for the World War I war effort. Information about her early career is largely absent, but by the 1920s, news reports revealed that the ship was sailing on the North Atlantic. By the mid-1920s, West Arrow was sailing for American Diamond on their cargo service to Rotterdam and Antwerp. In 1935, American Diamond changed the ship's name to Black Osprey and the ship continued in Rotterdam service.

After the outbreak of World War II, Black Osprey, still under the registry of the still-neutral United States, was detained twice by British authorities, before the U.S.-established "Neutrality Zone" ended Black Ospreys Dutch service in late 1939. Sailing under charter to the Isthmian Line in 1940, Black Osprey called at various ports in the Pacific Ocean. American Diamond sold Black Osprey to the British Ministry of War Transport in late 1940. The 11 survivors were picked up by a Norwegian ship and landed in at Barry.

Design and construction 
The West ships were cargo ships of similar size and design built by several shipyards on the West Coast of the United States for the USSB for emergency use during World War I. All were given names that began with the word West, like West Arrow, one of some 24 West ships built by Skinner & Eddy of Seattle, Washington. West Arrow (Skinner & Eddy No. 12) was laid down on 20 September 1917 under the name Jas. G. Eddy, launched as West Arrow on 19 January 1918, and completed on 26 February 1918.

The ship had a single steam turbine that drove her single screw propeller, and moved the ship at a  pace.

Career 
West Arrow was inspected by the 13th Naval District of the United States Navy after completion and was assigned the identification number of 2585. Had she been commissioned, she would have been known as USS West Arrow (ID-2585), but the Navy neither took over the ship nor commissioned her.

Little is known of West Arrows early career, with almost no information regarding her World War I activities. During that war, many of the West ships carried grain products to the United Kingdom, France, and Italy, but it is not known whether West Arrow did so or not. One early mention of West Arrow in contemporary news accounts is found in The Washington Post, which reported in February 1921 that the cargo ship had delivered 742 "milch cows" to Bremen as a gift from American farmers from Texas and Kansas. Haverford, headed from Philadelphia to Liverpool with passengers, struck the cargo ship on the port side,  from the bow. A radio dispatch from West Arrow reported that she was proceeding under her own power and was not taking on any water. By March 1926, West Arrow was sailing for American Diamond Lines in New York – Rotterdam service on a U.S. government-subsidized mail route. In July 1932, the ship was moved to a new Baltimore – Antwerp route, but by December 1934 was again sailing to Rotterdam.

In 1935, American Diamond changed the name of West Arrow to Black Osprey, which remained on the Rotterdam route into 1936. In March of that year, The Wall Street Journal—reporting on a large gold shipment from the United States to Holland—speculated that Black Osprey was the ship that had been selected to carry $345,000 of gold for export. On 24 March 1938, Black Osprey was sailing in a dense fog off St. Catherine's Point on the Isle of Wight when she struck the  British cargo ship Chagford, which sank within five minutes. Three of Chagford'''s six-man crew were picked up by Black Osprey, whose crew searched in vain for three hours for the other three men. After the fog lifted, the Chagford survivors were transferred to a fishing vessel that landed the crewmen, and Black Osprey resumed her Rotterdam – Philadelphia journey.

World War II
After the outbreak of World War II in September 1939, Black Osprey, still registered in the neutral-United States, was seized by British authorities on 6 September and detained at Weymouth. After carefully inspecting the ship for any contraband, the British released the ship after a week. However, on 31 October, the British again seized Black Osprey, and had not yet released her by 8 November, when the U.S. State Department released a list of 40 American ships that had been detained by belligerents.

The United States established a "Neutrality Zone"—a zone where American-flagged ships could not enter—in late 1939. As a result, American Diamond was unable to continue its Dutch route, and chartered the eight vessels it employed in that service (which included Black Osprey) to other U.S. companies. Black Osprey was one of several chartered to the Isthmian Line, and made voyages in the Pacific, calling at ports such as Singapore and Honolulu in 1940. After a typhoon with winds in excess of  hit Wake Island in early October, Black Osprey was diverted through heavy seas to check on the welfare of the 35 men on the island, all found to be safe.

In November, American Diamond sought the permission of the United States Maritime Commission (USMC), a successor to the United States Shipping Board, to sell Black Osprey and seven other ships to the British. The USMC granted the permission, and Black Osprey was sold to the Ministry of War Transport for operation by the Cairn Line of Newcastle-upon-Tyne, for about $50 per deadweight ton, or around $440,000.

The deal was completed before Black Ospreys 10 December sailing from Philadelphia to Baltimore under the British flag. Black Osprey then sailed from Baltimore on 25 January 1941 for Halifax, where she arrived on 30 January. Black Osprey, loaded with a cargo of steel, joined convoy HX 107 that sailed from that port for Liverpool on 3 February. After falling behind in the convoy, Black Osprey was torpedoed by U-96 under the command of Fregattenkapitän Heinrich Lehmann-Willenbrock at 02:27 on 18 February south of Iceland, near position . The ship's master and 24 crewmen died in the attack. Black Ospreys 11 survivors were picked up by the Norwegian refrigerated cargo ship Mosdale'' and landed at Barry.

Notes

References

Bibliography

External links 
 

Design 1013 ships
Ships built by Skinner & Eddy
Cargo ships of the United States
World War I merchant ships of the United States
World War I auxiliary ships of the United States
World War II merchant ships of the United States
World War II merchant ships of the United Kingdom
Ships sunk by German submarines in World War II
World War II shipwrecks in the Atlantic Ocean
1918 ships
Maritime incidents in 1938
Maritime incidents in February 1941